Jiudaru is a village in the Jhalda II CD block in the Jhalda subdivision of the Purulia district in the state of West Bengal, India.

Geography

Location

Area overview
Purulia district forms the lowest step of the Chota Nagpur Plateau. The general scenario is undulating land with scattered hills. Jhalda subdivision, shown in the map alongside, is located in the western part of the district, bordering Jharkhand. The Subarnarekha flows along a short stretch of its western border. It is an overwhelmingly rural subdivision with 91.02% of the population living in the rural areas and 8.98% living in the urban areas. There are 3 census towns in the subdivision. The map alongside shows some of the tourist attractions in the Ajodhya Hills. The area is home to Purulia Chhau dance with spectacular masks made at Charida. The remnants of old temples and deities are found in the subdivision also, as in other parts of the district.

Note: The map alongside presents some of the notable locations in the subdivision. All places marked in the map are linked in the larger full screen map.

Demographics
According to the 2011 Census of India, Jiudaru had a total population of 2,232, of which 1,129 (51%) were males and 1,103 (49%) were females. There were 394 persons in the age range of 0–6 years. The total number of literate persons in Jiudaru was 1,081 (58.81% of the population over 6 years).

Transport
Kotshila Junction railway station on the NSC Bose Gomoh-Hatia line of the South Eastern Railway is located nearby. The Purulia-Kotshila branch line connects to the NSC Bose Gomoh-Hatia line at Kotshila.

Education
Kotshila Mahavidyalaya was established in 2010. Affiliated with the Sidho Kanho Birsha University, it offers honours courses in Bengali, English, history and a general course in arts.

Jiudaru High School is a Bengali-medium coeducational institution established in 1971. It has facilities for teaching from class V to class XII.

Healthcare
Muralhar Kotshila Rural Hospital, with 30 beds, is the major government medical facility in the Jhalda II CD block.

References

Villages in Purulia district